Gerard John Denton (born 7 August 1975) is an Australian former first-class cricketer who played for Tasmania. The right-arm fast-medium bowler began his first-class cricket for Tasmania, despite having been born in Queensland. He switched to the Victoria for two seasons (2005/06 and 06/07), before returning to Tasmania for the 2007/08 season.

Denton has had a career hampered by injuries. When fit he can be destructive, as shown by when he dismissed Stuart Law, Allan Border and Jimmy Maher in the space of six deliveries on debut in the 1994–95 summer. He took a couple of years off before returning in 1998–99 for Tasmania and earning Australia A selection. Stress fractures would set him back both in 1999–2000 and 2000–01. He recovered and reappeared in 2001–02 and after a couple of decent seasons he was back to his best in 2003–04, taking 30 wickets at 33.13. He moved to Victoria the following summer but did not get much game time due to hip and foot injuries. His only appearance for the Bushrangers was an ING Cup game. In 2005–06 he made the headlines by breaking one of Justin Langer's ribs which cost the opener a Test place. It would be another painful season for Denton as he suffered from appendicitis late in the summer which meant that he could not line up in the Pura Cup final. He still finished Victoria's leading wicket taker with 33 at 28.15 from his eight matches.

External links
 

1975 births
Living people
Tasmania cricketers
Victoria cricketers
People from Mount Isa
Australian cricketers
Cricketers from Queensland